Adrenalina 2 (Adrenaline 2) is the special edition of the second album Adrenalina by the Italian pop rock group Finley. It includes some new English versions of the previous songs ("All I've Got", "My Blinded Eyes", "Just For You", "Driving To Nowhere" and "Drops Of Time"). The cover is different as well. (It has rainbow faces of the members of the band on the front, while the cover of Adrenalina is yellow).
There is also a feature with the Mexican singer Belinda, the new single "Your Hero", and a cover of the song "Iris" by Goo Goo Dolls. There are two live tracks too: "Niente da perdere" (Nothing to lose) and "Medley" in Milan, composed by their three debut songs "Diventerai una star" (You're gonna be a star), "Fumo e Cenere" (Smoke and ash), and "Tutto è Possibile" (Everything is possible).

There is also a version of this album that includes a CD and a DVD, that includes a slideshow of their best photos.

This album made Finley win the Platinum Disc only a few weeks later.

Track list
All songs written and composed by Marco Pedretti, Carmine Ruggiero, Stefano Mantegazza and Danilo Calvio.

 "Ad occhi chiusi" (With my closed eyes) – 3.42
 "Domani" (Tomorrow) – 3.48
 "Adrenalina" (Adrenaline) – 2.55
 "Mai più" (Never Again) – 4.04
 "Driving to Nowhere" – 3.13
 "Ricordi" (Memories) – 3.58
 "Qui per voi" (Here for you) – 4.11
 "Drops of time" – 2.53
 "C'è qualcosa che non va" (There is something wrong) – 3.11
 "Questo sono io" (This is me) – 3.17
 "Voglio" (I want) – 3.16
 "Satisfied" – 3.14
 "Lies are all around me" – 3.23
 "Iris" – 3.28
 "Your Hero" – 3.59
 "My Blinded Eyes" – 3.41
 "All I've got" – 3.10
 "Just For You" – 4.15
 "Medley live: Fumo e cenere/Diventerai una star/Tutto è possibile" (Smoke and ash/You'll become a star/Everything is possible) – 4.32
 "Niente da perdere" (Nothing to lose)  – 3.37

Singles 
 "Ricordi" (Memories) (February 26, 2008)
 "Your Hero" (March 3, 2008)
 "Ad occhi chiusi" (With my closed eyes) (May 26, 2008)

Personnel 
 Marco Pedretti – lead vocals
 Carmine Ruggiero – guitars, vocals
 Stefano Mantegazza – bass, vocals
 Danilo Calvio – drums, vocals

References 

2008 albums
Finley (band) albums